The 2011–12 LEB Plata season is the 12th  season of the LEB Plata, second league of the Liga Española de Baloncesto and third division in Spain. It is also named Adecco Plata for sponsorship reasons.

Competition format
Teams will play a regular season of 26 weeks with a Round-robin tournament format. This regular season will start on October 8 and will finish on April 20. The regular season champion will promote directly to LEB Oro and the last qualified will be relegated to Liga EBA. Teams qualified from second to ninth will join the promotion playoffs. The winner will promote also to LEB Oro.

The two first qualified teams after the first half of the league will play the Copa LEB Plata.

Eligibility of players
All teams must have in their roster:
A minimum of seven players who played in Spain during three season being between 15 and 20 years old.
A maximum of two non-EU players. This players can be replaced by players from the EU or ACP countries.
A maximum of two players from the EU or ACP countries.

Teams can not sign any player after February 29, 2012.

Team information
Champion of last season Knet Rioja and playoffs winner Iberostar Bàsquet Mallorca were promoted to LEB Oro. Fundación Adepal Alcázar and Aguas de Sousas Ourense were relegated from LEB Oro to LEB Plata. Adepal resigned to its spot and was dissolved.

Aurteneche Maquinaria, Gandía Bàsquet, Platja de Palma and Eninter CB Santfeliuenc were the Liga EBA playoffs winners and promoted to LEB Plata, but Palma and Santfeliuenc refused to play in this league and stayed in Liga EBA. Lan Mobel ISB was also relegated to Liga EBA from LEB Plata.

By July 12, only seven teams were confirmed to play in LEB Plata. These teams were Aguas de Sousas Ourense (relegated from LEB Oro), River Andorra, CB Prat, Fontedoso Carrefour El Bulevar de Ávila, FC Barcelona Regal B, Aurteneche Maquinaria (champion of last Liga EBA) and Tenerife Baloncesto (achieved one of the vacants).

The Spanish Basketball Federation conceded an extension of the July 28 deadline for nine more teams. At this date, four more teams were admitted: Gandía Bàsquet, Leyma Natura Básquet Coruña, Lan Mobel ISB and CB Las Rozas, who played last season in 1ª División (fifth tier, one below Liga EBA).

Some teams demanded a new extension to get the endorsement, and the Federation conceded it until August 10. Oviedo CB and Plasencia Extremadura were admitted after this last extension.

Regular season

League table
{| class="wikitable" style="text-align: center;"
! width=20| # !! Teams !! width=20|P !! width=20|W !! width=20|L !! width=35|PF !! width=35|PA !! width=20|PT !! Qualification or relegation
|- bgcolor=ACE1AF
|1||align="left"|River Andorra || 24 || 19 || 5 || 1825 || 1578 || 44 || align="center"|Promotion to LEB Oro
|- bgcolor=D0F0C0
|2||align="left"|Aguas de Sousas Ourense || 24 || 17 || 7 || 1764 || 1663 || 41 || rowspan=8 align="center"| Promotion playoffs
|- bgcolor=D0F0C0
|3||align="left"|CB Prat Joventut || 24 || 15 || 9 || 1810 || 1694 || 39
|- bgcolor=D0F0C0
|4||align="left"|Omnia CB Las Rozas || 24 || 15 || 9 || 1845 || 1763 || 39
|- bgcolor=D0F0C0
|5||align="left"|Leyma Natura Básquet Coruña || 24 || 13 || 11 || 1683 || 1576 || 37
|- bgcolor=D0F0C0
|6||align="left"|Aurteneche Maquinaria Araba/Álava (C) || 24 || 13 || 11 || 1748 || 1734 || 37
|- bgcolor=D0F0C0
|7||align="left"|FC Barcelona Regal B || 24 || 12 || 12 || 1856 || 1845 || 36
|- bgcolor=D0F0C0
|8||align="left"|Fontedoso Carrefour El Bulevar de Ávila || 24 || 12 || 12 || 1589 || 1605 || 36
|- bgcolor=D0F0C0
|9||align="left"|Lan Mobel ISB || 24 || 12 || 12 || 1751 || 1747 || 36
|-
|10||align="left"|Oviedo CB || 24 || 8 || 16 || 1724 || 1888 || 32
|-
|11||align="left"|Plasencia Extremadura || 24 || 8 || 16 || 1629 || 1752 || 32
|-
|12||align="left"|Tenerife Baloncesto || 24 || 7 || 17 || 1764 || 1849 || 31
|- bgcolor=FFCCCC
|13||align="left"|Gandía Bàsquet || 24 || 5 || 19 || 1564 || 1858 || 29 || Relegation to Liga EBA
|-

(C) = Copa LEB Plata champion

Results
{| style="font-size: 90%; text-align: center" class="wikitable"
|-
|
| align="center" width=50|COB
| width=50|ARA
| width=50|PRAT
| width=50|FCB
| width=50|AVI
| width=50|GAN
| width=50|ISB
| width=50|COR
| width=50|ROZ
| width=50|OCB
| width=50|PLA
| width=50|BCA
| width=50|TF
|-
|align=left|Aguas de Sousas Ourense
| style="background:#ccc;"|
| style="background:#dfd;"|68–62
| style="background:#dfd;"|62–52
| style="background:#dfd;"|79–69
| style="background:#dfd;"|69–51
| style="background:#fdd;"|75–81
| style="background:#dfd;"|74–62
| style="background:#dfd;"|67–66
| style="background:#dfd;"|88–70
| style="background:#dfd;"|75–58
| style="background:#dfd;"|76–61
| style="background:#dfd;"|82–66
| style="background:#dfd;"|68–57
|-
|align=left|Aurteneche Maquinaria Araba/Álava
| style="background:#dfd;"|81–76
| style="background:#ccc;"|
| style="background:#dfd;"|84–64
| style="background:#fdd;"|80–92
| style="background:#dfd;"|79–74
| style="background:#dfd;"|78–57
| style="background:#fdd;"|71–82
| style="background:#fdd;"|79–81
| style="background:#fdd;"|80–91
| style="background:#dfd;"|77–65
| style="background:#dfd;"|77–74
| style="background:#fdd;"|69–81
| style="background:#fdd;"|70–78
|-
|align=left|CB Prat Joventut
| style="background:#dfd;"|71–70
| style="background:#fdd;"|69–74
| style="background:#ccc;"|
| style="background:#dfd;"|77–76
| style="background:#fdd;"|64–81
| style="background:#dfd;"|89–67
| style="background:#dfd;"|82–70
| style="background:#dfd;"|71–67
| style="background:#dfd;"|90–75
| style="background:#dfd;"|101–53
| style="background:#dfd;"|78–68
| style="background:#dfd;"|75–70
| style="background:#dfd;"|85–70
|-
|align=left|FC Barcelona Regal B
| style="background:#fdd;"|72–77
| style="background:#fdd;"|52–64
| style="background:#fdd;"|88–93
| style="background:#ccc;"|
| style="background:#dfd;"|74–64
| style="background:#dfd;"|89–71
| style="background:#dfd;"|94–82
| style="background:#dfd;"|82–65
| style="background:#dfd;"|82–66
| style="background:#fdd;"|75–81
| style="background:#dfd;"|79–72
| style="background:#dfd;"|93–88
| style="background:#dfd;"|89–79
|-
|align=left|Fontedoso Carrefour El Bulevar de Ávila
| style="background:#dfd;"|69–56
| style="background:#dfd;"|48–47
| style="background:#fdd;"|62–78
| style="background:#dfd;"|76–62
| style="background:#ccc;"|
| style="background:#dfd;"|73–51
| style="background:#dfd;"|75–70
| style="background:#dfd;"|61–53
| style="background:#fdd;"|74–77
| style="background:#dfd;"|68–57
| style="background:#dfd;"|70–60
| style="background:#dfd;"|56–54
| style="background:#fdd;"|70–79
|-
|align=left|Gandía Bàsquet
| style="background:#fdd;"|73–83
| style="background:#dfd;"|66–65
| style="background:#fdd;"|62–90
| style="background:#fdd;"|61–69
| style="background:#fdd;"|51–65
| style="background:#ccc;"|
| style="background:#fdd;"|49–69
| style="background:#fdd;"|62–69
| style="background:#fdd;"|72–80
| style="background:#fdd;"|69–74
| style="background:#dfd;"|78–61
| style="background:#fdd;"|52–78
| style="background:#dfd;"|63–61
|-
|align=left|Lan Mobel ISB
| style="background:#dfd;"|84–70
| style="background:#fdd;"|81–84
| style="background:#dfd;"|73–66
| style="background:#fdd;"|78–80
| style="background:#dfd;"|66–53
| style="background:#dfd;"|89–69
| style="background:#ccc;"|
| style="background:#fdd;"|58–71
| style="background:#dfd;"|76–64
| style="background:#dfd;"|82–78
| style="background:#fdd;"|82–89
| style="background:#fdd;"|73–83
| style="background:#dfd;"|78–73
|-
|align=left|Leyma Natura Básquet Coruña
| style="background:#fdd;"|66–75
| style="background:#dfd;"|72–48
| style="background:#dfd;"|68–65
| style="background:#dfd;"|66–61
| style="background:#dfd;"|81–57
| style="background:#dfd;"|84–60
| style="background:#fdd;"|54–62
| style="background:#ccc;"|
| style="background:#fdd;"|68–76
| style="background:#dfd;"|91–71
| style="background:#dfd;"|89–58
| style="background:#fdd;"|52–65
| style="background:#dfd;"|81–60
|-
|align=left|Omnia CB Las Rozas
| style="background:#fdd;"|71–78
| style="background:#fdd;"|76–79
| style="background:#dfd;"|75–61
| style="background:#dfd;"|93–66
| style="background:#dfd;"|73–64
| style="background:#dfd;"|85–69
| style="background:#dfd;"|76–57
| style="background:#dfd;"|64–61
| style="background:#ccc;"|
| style="background:#dfd;"|86–67
| style="background:#fdd;"|80–81
| style="background:#fdd;"|74–83
| style="background:#dfd;"|89–86
|-
|align=left|Oviedo CB
| style="background:#fdd;"|74–80
| style="background:#fdd;"|76–82
| style="background:#fdd;"|59–80
| style="background:#dfd;"|83–79
| style="background:#dfd;"|79–67
| style="background:#fdd;"|64–69
| style="background:#dfd;"|78–66
| style="background:#dfd;"|86–82
| style="background:#fdd;"|72–82
| style="background:#ccc;"|
| style="background:#dfd;"|79–54
| style="background:#fdd;"|63–78
| style="background:#fdd;"|101–105
|-
|align=left|Plasencia Extremadura
| style="background:#dfd;"|77–68
| style="background:#fdd;"|68–77
| style="background:#fdd;"|62–69
| style="background:#fdd;"|67–74
| style="background:#dfd;"|75–59
| style="background:#dfd;"|84–71
| style="background:#dfd;"|68–63
| style="background:#fdd;"|54–67
| style="background:#fdd;"|62–75
| style="background:#dfd;"|76–55
| style="background:#ccc;"|
| style="background:#fdd;"|58–71
| style="background:#dfd;"|75–57
|-
|align=left|River Andorra
| style="background:#dfd;"|91–53
| style="background:#dfd;"|76–73
| style="background:#dfd;"|83–70
| style="background:#dfd;"|78–63
| style="background:#dfd;"|77–72
| style="background:#dfd;"|87–66
| style="background:#fdd;"|67–70
| style="background:#dfd;"|66–48
| style="background:#dfd;"|76–72
| style="background:#dfd;"|81–51
| style="background:#dfd;"|76–65
| style="background:#ccc;"|
| style="background:#dfd;"|72–60
|-
|align=left|Tenerife Baloncesto
| style="background:#fdd;"|80–85
| style="background:#fdd;"|67–68
| style="background:#dfd;"|75–70
| style="background:#dfd;"|91–80
| style="background:#fdd;"|73–80
| style="background:#dfd;"|81–55
| style="background:#fdd;"|73–78
| style="background:#fdd;"|65–81
| style="background:#fdd;"|71–75
| style="background:#fdd;"|73–98
| style="background:#dfd;"|82–60
| style="background:#fdd;"|68–78
| style="background:#ccc;"|
|-

Promotion playoffs
The playoffs will start on 24 April 2012, and it will finish on May 23, 25 or 27 if necessary.

The quarterfinal round will be played in a best-of-three games format, with the best ranked team playing games 1 and 3 if necessary at home. Semifinals and finals will be played in a best-of-5 games format, with the seeded playing the games 1, 2 and 5 if necessary at home. The winner of the playoffs will promote to 2012–2013 LEB Oro season with River Andorra, the champion of the regular season.

Copa LEB Plata
At the half of the league, the two first teams in the table play the Copa LEB Plata at home of the winner of the first half season (13th round). If this team doesn't want to host the Copa LEB Plata, the second qualified can do it. If nobody wants to host it, the Federation will propose a neutral venue.

The Champion of this Cup will play the play-offs as first qualified if it finishes the league between the 2nd and the 5th qualified. The Copa LEB Plata will be played on January 29, 2012.

Teams qualified

The game

Awards

All LEB Plata team
Team made after the playoffs.

 Ander Ortiz de Pinedo (Aurteneche Maquinaria Araba/Álava)
 Kyle Hill (Aguas de Sousas Ourense)
 Marcus Eriksson (FC Barcelona Regal B)
 Javier Salsón (Omnia CB Las Rozas)
 Marko Todorović (CB Prat Joventut)

Regular season MVP
Marko Todorović – CB Prat Joventut

MVP week by week

Regular season

Playoffs

References

External links
LEB Plata website in FEB.es

LEB Plata seasons
LEB3